Városi Stadion (literally Town Stadium) is a multi-use stadium in Tatabánya, Hungary.  It is currently used mostly for football matches and is the home stadium of FC Tatabánya.  The stadium is able to hold 15,500 people.

External links
Városi Stadion Tatabánya at magyarfutball.hu

Football venues in Hungary
Tatabánya
Buildings and structures in Komárom-Esztergom County